Sir Andrew Noble, 1st Baronet  (13 September 1831 – 22 October 1915) was a Scottish physicist noted for his work on ballistics and gunnery.

Early life
Born at Greenock, he was educated at Edinburgh Academy and at the Royal Military Academy, Woolwich.  He was commissioned in the Royal Artillery in 1849, promoted captain in 1855 and became secretary of the Royal Artillery Institution. He was secretary of the British government select committee on the replacement of smooth-bore cannon with rifled artillery and carried out research on the subject. In 1859 he became Assistant-Inspector of Artillery and in 1860 a member of the Ordnance Select Committee and of the Committee on Explosives, remaining on the committee until it was dissolved in 1880.

Notable work
In 1860 he joined Armstrong's armaments works in Elswick, Newcastle-upon-Tyne, first as joint manager and, from 1861, as a partner, where he continued research into artillery, in particular inventing ways of measuring breech pressures. In 1862 he invented the Electro-Mechanical Chronoscope to measure small time intervals between triggers inserted into a gun to determine the acceleration of projectiles as they travelled down the barrel, allowing him to assess the performance of different powders.

He worked with Sir Frederick Abel on improving the properties of black powder, making it burn more slowly to produce more gas and a more consistent pressure, with the result that he was able to increase muzzle velocities from 1600 to 2100 feet per second, while the energy developed increased by about 75%. Noble's work also assisted Abel's further development of a new smokeless powder, cordite, in 1889. These developments required the re-design of both the guns and their mountings, manufactured by Armstrongs, which gave them a competitive advantage, ultimately helping the company expand into shipbuilding, locomotives, tanks and aircraft to become one of the world's largest armament firms by 1914. With Sir William Armstrong's effective retirement from active control in about 1890, Noble's primary role changed from scientist to businessman, formally becoming chairman in 1900, and he oversaw much of this growth of the company. Noble claimed that all the Japanese guns which sank the Russian fleet at the crucial battle of Tsushima in 1905, had been manufactured at Elswick.

In 1870, at the age of 38 he was recognised for his scientific work and was elected a Fellow of the Royal Society. He was awarded the Society's Gold Medal in 1880. He was made a Companion of the order of the Bath in 1881 and knighted in 1893. He served as High Sheriff of Northumberland in 1896. It was announced that he would receive a baronetcy in the 1902 Coronation Honours list published on 26 June 1902 for the (subsequently postponed) coronation of King Edward VII, and on 24 July 1902 he was created a Baronet, of Ardmore and Ardardan Noble, in the parish of Cardross, in the county of Dumbarton.

Personal life
In 1854, while stationed with his regiment in Quebec, Noble married Margery Durham Campbell. They had four sons and two daughters. Margery lived to the age of 101.

Noble's first and second sons George and Saxton became successively second and third baronets, while his third son John Noble, also involved with Armstrongs, was created a baronet in his own right in 1923. The latter's youngest son Michael Noble became a prominent Conservative politician and was created a life peer as Baron Glenkinglas in 1974.

Noble's youngest daughter Ethel married Alfred Cochrane cricketer and poet who was Company Secretary at Armstrongs.

Architectural patronage
Noble and his sons used their wealth to commission a number of important houses from some of the foremost architects of the day.

In 1871, he bought Jesmond Dene House, which was originally designed by John Dobson, and commissioned Norman Shaw and later local architect Frank West Rich to double the size of the house adding a west wing, billiard room, Gothic porch, Great Hall and a range of bedrooms. In 1894 he also built a real tennis court in the grounds of the house, one of only around 50 currently in use worldwide. Jesmond Dene House is now an hotel and restaurant.

In 1905, Noble bought the Ardkinglas estate on Loch Fyne in Argyllshire, commissioning Sir Robert Lorimer to build a large new house, Lorimer's masterpiece, and later to restore Dunderave Castle on the other side of the loch.

In 1910 his eldest son George commissioned Randall Wells to rebuild Besford Court, Worcestershire in a Tudor gothic style, the architect's masterpiece and the last great gothic English country house.

In 1911 his second son Saxton commissioned Reginald Blomfield to build Wretham Hall, Norfolk in a William and Mary style. Following the near-collapse of Armstrongs in 1927 Wretham was demolished, and Saxton commissioned designs for a topiary garden representing the plan of a huge house for the site from Sir Edwin Lutyens.

In 1920 his youngest son Philip again commissioned Sir Robert Lorimer to alter Glendoe, Inverness-shire.

Orders, decorations, and medals

 Grand Cross of the Imperial Order of the Rose
 Commander of the Order of the Crown of Italy
 Commander of the Portuguese Order of Christ
 Royal Medallist of the Royal Society (1880)
 Companion of the Order of the Bath (1881)
 Knight Commander of the Order of the Bath (1893)
 Knight of the Order of Charles III
 Baronet in the Baronetage of the United Kingdom (1902)

See also
Internal ballistics
Noble baronets

References

1831 births
1915 deaths
People from Greenock
People educated at Edinburgh Academy
Graduates of the Royal Military Academy, Woolwich
Royal Artillery officers
Noble, Andrew, 1st Baronet
Royal Medal winners
Presidents of the Smeatonian Society of Civil Engineers
Scottish physicists
Knights Commander of the Order of the Bath
Fellows of the Royal Society
High Sheriffs of Northumberland
Knights Bachelor
Ballistics experts